Greya politella is a moth of the  family Prodoxidae. It is found from southern British Columbia to the Channel Islands of California and the southern Sierra Nevada, and from the Pacific coast to eastern Idaho and south-western Colorado. It is found in a variety of habitats, ranging from open oak woodlands in the south to open grassland and the edges of dry, open ponderosa pine forests in the north, as well as sagebrush steppe in Washington.

The wingspan is 11.5–20 mm. The forewings are uniform brownish grey scattered with grayish white scales, giving them an iridescent bronzy lustre. The hindwings are of the same color, but do not possess the iridescent bronzy lustre.

The larvae feed on Saxifragaceae species, including Lithophragma, Heuchera grossulariifolia, Heuchera micrantha and Heuchera saxicola. They initially live in a capsule of their host plant, feeding on the seeds. Older larvae create a shelter of leaves on their host and complete feeding from within. Pupation takes place inside this shelter.

References

Moths described in 1888
Prodoxidae